Flo V. Schwarz is the lead vocalist, guitarist, and head of the German band Pyogenesis that co-invented gothic metal in the early 1990s. He is also owner of the Hamburg, Germany-based record label and management company Hamburg Records.

Music  
The greater successes of his band Pyogenesis were sold-out tours and shows in Mexico, Russia, Asia or Hungary, where they played in front of more than half a million people as well as #1 in the German Alternative Charts, #1 in the Mexican Import Charts or entries in national charts. Flo V. Schwarz is also a producer for Punk and Metal bands.
Another band Liquido with former band members from Pyogenesis had a hit song with Narcotic.

Hamburg Records 
His company Hamburg Records is working with national and international bands Top 10 and #1 bands in the national charts. Besides the record label and management divisions Hamburg Records also is one of the biggest Rock merchandise suppliers in Germany.

Personal life 
Flo V. Schwarz has two daughters (*2009 and *2012) and lives with them in Hamburg, Germany.

Discography 
with Pyogenesis
 2017 A Kingdom To Disappear (AFM Records)
 2015 A Century In The Curse Of Time (AFM Records)
 2002 She Makes Me Wish I Had a Gun (Hamburg Records / Sony Music)
 1998 Mono … Or Will It Ever Be the Way It Used to Be (Nuclear Blast / Warner Music)
 1997 Unpop (Nuclear Blast / Warner Music)
 1995 Twinaleblood ( Warner Music / Nuclear Blast)
 1994 Sweet X-Rated Nothings (Nuclear Blast / Warner Music)
 1993 Pyogenesis (Osmose Productions / SPV)
 1992 Ignis Creatio (Osmose Productions / SPV)

References 

German male singers
German guitarists
German male guitarists
Living people
Musicians from Hamburg
Year of birth missing (living people)